Judith Nyambura Mwangi (born 30 April 1986), better known by her mononym Avril,  is a Kenyan singer-songwriter, actress and entertainer. She was formerly signed to Ogopa Deejays, one of the leading music production and record labels in Kenya. As a singer, she is popularly known for her singles "Mama", "Kitu Kimoja", "Chokoza" and "Hakuna Yule". As an actress, she is best known for playing Miss B'Have on Shuga: Love, Sex, Money (2012). Avril's contributions to the Kenyan entertainment industry have earned her one Nzumari Award, one Kisima Music Award, one Golden Mic Award and two Chaguo La Teeniez Awards.

Life and career

Biography and music career
Avril was born and raised in Nakuru, the former capital of the Rift Valley Province. She was very active in drama and music festivals while in high school. Avril later relocated to Nairobi to pursue an undergraduate education. In 2005, she partook in the Jaza Lorry initiative and met talent manager Emmanuel Banda of Ogopa Deejays Production. Although Banda tried convincing her to venture into music, Avril remained hesitant at the time. She enrolled at the University of Nairobi in 2006 and studied design. She changed her mind about music during her second year at UoN and recorded her debut single "Mama" after signing a record deal with Ogopa Deejays; the song was released in 2009 and sent to radio stations across Kenya. Avril was later featured on Colonel Mustapha's "Mtaani dot com" (sometimes stylized as "mtaani.com"). The music video for "Mtaani dot com" was released and uploaded to YouTube on 15 October 2009.

Avril began to gain prominence following her collaboration with A.Y on his 2010 single "Leo" (Remix). Her collaborative single with Sudanese singer Lam, titled "Changes", was released in Sudan. In November 2010, she was featured on Marya's breakthrough single "Chokoza"; the song was released to critical acclaim and received numerous radio airplay. On 31 January 2012, Avril released her single "Kitu Kimoja". The music video for the song was shot at a resort on the Kenyan coast line. In February 2013, Avril released "Hakuna Yule". In January 2014, she debunked rumors regarding her exit from Ogopa Deejays and said the relationship she has with the label's executives was built on understanding. In March 2014, Avril was featured on the chorus of Boomba Boyz's 2014 single "Piga Kengele". In July 2014, she performed at the Tusker Meru 7 After Party.

Acting career

2011–12: Shuga: Love, Sex, Money
Avril made her acting debut in the second season of the television soap opera Shuga. She played the character Miss B'Have, a celebrity singer who is a firm believer in monogamous relationships. She also played Belinda, a minor character. She was offered the roles after auditioning for the producers of the show. In a 2012 interview with Capital Lifestyle, Avril said playing both characters was therapeutic and that starring in the series was an emotional rollercoaster due to the feelings she developed for her co-star Nick Mutuma. She also said starring in the series reminded her about the dangers of HIV/AIDS.

2013–14: Noose of Gold (Season 5) 
In February 2013, Avril joined the cast of M-Net's Noose of Gold. She played the role of Corrine, a drug trafficker.

Musical influences and humanitarian work
Avril has cited Amani, Blu 3, Tiwa Savage, Liquideep, Alicia Keys and Beyoncé as musicians who inspired her. She also cited Michael Jackson, Kenny Rogers, Alicia keys and Beyoncé as her favourite artists. Her inspiration to write and record music stems from her life experiences. Avril has been involved in several humanitarian campaigns, including the Chagua Amani Peace Campaign and Kenya Land Alliance. In February 2015, she became one of East Africa's ambassadors for Oriflame Sweden and AMREF's Save an African Mother Campaign.

Discography

Singles

Filmography

Films

Television

Awards and nominations

References

External links

Avril at SoundCloud

1986 births
Living people
People from Nakuru County
21st-century Kenyan women singers
Kisima Music Award winners
Kenyan film actresses
University of Nairobi alumni
21st-century Kenyan actresses